

Walter Wessel (21 April 1892 – 20 July 1943) was a general in the Wehrmacht of Nazi Germany during World War II who commanded the 12th Panzer Division. He was a recipient of the Knight's Cross of the Iron Cross with Oak Leaves. Wessel was responsible for the Ciepielów massacre in Poland. He was killed in an auto accident on 20 July 1943 near Morano, Italy.

Awards and decorations

 Knight's Cross of the Iron Cross with Oak Leaves
 Knight's Cross on 15 August 1940 as Oberst and commander of Infanterie-Regiment 15 (mot.)
 76th Oak Leaves on 17 February 1942 as Oberst and commander of Infanterie-Regiment 15 (mot.)

References

Citations

Bibliography

 
 

1892 births
1943 deaths
People from Goslar (district)
Lieutenant generals of the German Army (Wehrmacht)
German mass murderers
Perpetrators of World War II prisoner of war massacres
German Army personnel of World War I
Recipients of the clasp to the Iron Cross, 1st class
Recipients of the Knight's Cross of the Iron Cross with Oak Leaves
Road incident deaths in Italy
Prussian Army personnel
Reichswehr personnel
People from the Province of Hanover
Military personnel from Lower Saxony
German Army generals of World War II
Nazi war criminals